Mycothiol (MSH or AcCys-GlcN-Ins) is an unusual thiol compound found in the Actinomycetota. It is composed of a cysteine residue with an acetylated amino group linked to glucosamine, which is then linked to inositol. The oxidized, disulfide form of mycothiol (MSSM) is called mycothione, and is reduced to mycothiol by the flavoprotein mycothione reductase. Mycothiol biosynthesis and mycothiol-dependent enzymes such as mycothiol-dependent formaldehyde dehydrogenase and mycothione reductase have been proposed to be good drug targets for the development of treatments for tuberculosis.

See also 
 Glutathione, analogous function in other Bacteria
 Bacillithiol

References 

Mycobacterium tuberculosis is extraordinarily sensitive to killing by a vitamin C-induced Fenton reaction
Published 21 May 2013. Nature Communications4,
Article number:1881 doi:10.1038/ncomms2898

External links 
The Biochemistry of Pathogens: The metabolism and function of mycothiol in the mycobacteria.

Thiols
Acetamides
Propionamides
Tetrahydropyrans